The men's artistic individual all-around competition at the 2008 Summer Olympics was held at the Beijing National Indoor Stadium on August 9 and 14. There were 98 competitors from 35 nations. The event was won by Yang Wei of China, the nation's first victory in the event since 1996 and second overall. Yang, who had earned silver in 2000, was the 13th man to receive multiple medals in the individual all-around (and the first to do so in non-consecutive Games). Japan's Kōhei Uchimura took silver; it was the first medal in the event for Japan since 1984, the last of a four-decade stretch where the nation reached the podium every time it competed (7 of 8 Games from 1956 to 1984, with Japan boycotting the 1980 Games). Benoît Caranobe of France took bronze, the first men's all-around medal for that nation since 1920.

Background

This was the 25th appearance of the men's individual all-around. The first individual all-around competition had been held in 1900, after the 1896 competitions featured only individual apparatus events. A men's individual all-around has been held every Games since 1900.

Six of the top 10 gymnasts from the 2004 Games returned: silver medalist Kim Dae-Eun and bronze medalist Yang Tae Young of South Korea, fifth-place finisher Rafael Martínez of Spain, sixth-place finisher Hiroyuki Tomita of Japan, seventh-place finisher (and 2000 silver medalist) Yang Wei of China, and eighth-place finisher Marian Drăgulescu of Romania. Tomita had won the World Championship in 2005; Yang Wei had won the next two in 2006 and 2007 (the first repeat champion since the 1920s) and was the heavy favorite coming into the Games.

Uzbekistan, Venezuela, and Yemen each made their debut in the event. France made its 23rd appearance, most among nations.

Qualification

Qualification for the men's artistic gymnastics in 2008 was based entirely on the 2007 World Artistic Gymnastics Championships. The top 12 teams at the world championships could send a full team of 6 gymnasts to the Olympics. The next 3 teams (#13 through #15) could send 2 gymnasts. The 3 teams after that (#16 through #18) could send 1 gymnast. The next 7 individual gymnasts (only from nations without any qualified gymnasts yet) and apparatus gold medal winners also qualified. The FIG Executive Board made invitational selections to ensure host country and continental representation and the Tripartite Commission made an invitation. The quota of 98 gymnasts was then filled through additional individual gymnasts.

Competition format

In the third straight Games with a significant format change, the Code of Points was implemented. Rather than exercise scores being scored on a 0 to 10 scale (the "perfect 10" system), scoring was now based on two separate scores that were then combined in order to come to the final score. The A score measured the difficulty of each element (and combinations of elements) within the routine, while the B score evaluated the performance, ie, the "execution, composition and artistry" of the routine. There was no longer a theoretical top score.

The rest of the format remained the same as before. There was a preliminary round and a final. All gymnasts were ranked based on the sum of their exercise scores for all six apparatus, which gave an all-around qualification score. (Gymnasts that did not compete on every apparatus, of course, having significantly lower scores than those who did.) The top 24 competitors moved on to the individual all-around final, though nations were limited to two competitors each even if more qualified.

In the individual all-around final, each gymnast competed on each apparatus again. Only scores from the final were used to determine final rankings.

Schedule

All times are China Standard Time (UTC+8)

Results

The twenty-four competitors with the highest scores in qualifying proceed to the men's artistic individual all-around finals.

References

External links
Qualification results

Gymnastics at the 2008 Summer Olympics
2008
Olympics
Men's events at the 2008 Summer Olympics